The Văcăroiu Cabinet was the 111th cabinet of Romania between 1992 and 1996, led by Nicolae Văcăroiu. After the 1992 general elections, when FDSN obtained 27.75% of the votes in the Chamber of Deputies, and 28.31% in the Senate, the reelected President, Ion Iliescu, nominated in November 1992 Nicolae Văcăroiu as Prime Minister of a minority cabinet formed by FDSN. 

The Văcăroiu Cabinet was supported in the Romanian parliament by a legislative coalition called ”the Red Quadrilateral” between FDSN, PRM (Partidul România Mare, the Great Romania Party), PUNR (Partidul Unității Naționale a Românilor, the National Unity of Romanians Party), PDAR (Partidul Democrației Agrare din România, the Agrarian Democracy from Romania Party), and PSM (Partidul Socialist al Muncii, the Socialist Party of Labour).

Membership

Prime Minister: 
Nicolae Văcăroiu

Ministers of State
Mișu Negrițoiu/Mircea Coșea
Dan Mircea Popescu
Teodor Meleșcanu
Florin Georgescu

Ministers
Petre Ninosu/Gavril Iosif Chiuzbaian/Ion Predescu (Justice)
Florin Georgescu (Finance)
Niculae Spiroiu/Gheorghe Tinca (Defense)
Mihai Golu/Liviu Maior/Marin Sorescu/Viorel Mărgineanu/Grigore Zanc (Culture and Arts)
Ioan Oancea/Valeriu Tabără/Alexandru Lăpușan (Agriculture)
Teodor Meleșcanu (Foreign Affairs)
Marin Cristea (Public Works)
Constantin Teculescu/Cristian Ionescu/Petru Crișan/Dan Ioan Popescu (Commerce)
George Ioan Dănescu/Doru Ioan Tărăcilă (Interior)
Liviu Maior (Education)
Aurel-Constantin Ilie (Environment)
Dan Mircea Popescu (Labor)
Paul Teodoru/Aurel Novac (Transport)
Iulian Mincu/Daniela Bartoș (Health)
Andrei Chirică/Adrian Turicu/Mircea Coșea (Communication)
Dumitru Popescu/Alexandru Stănescu (Industries)
Matei-Agathon Dan (Tourism)
Doru Dumitru Palade/Valer Dorneanu/Petre Ninosu (Research and Technology)
Gheorghe Angelescu/Alexandru Mironov (Youth and Sport)

Notes

Cabinets of Romania
1992 establishments in Romania
1996 disestablishments in Romania
Cabinets established in 1992
Cabinets disestablished in 1996